In Gallo-Roman religion, Buxenus was an epithet of the Gaulish Mars, known from a single inscription found in Velleron in the Vaucluse.

References

Gaulish gods
Nature gods
Mars (mythology)